Bothriochloa barbinodis is a species of grass known by the common name cane bluestem. It is native to the Americas, including most of South and Central America, Mexico, and the southernmost continental United States from California to Florida.

This is a perennial bunchgrass growing in upright clumps 60 to 120 centimeters (24-48 inches) tall. The straw-colored stems have nodes at intervals which are fringed with fluffy hairs. The leaves are 20 to 30 centimeters (8-12 inches) long and blue-green when new, drying to a reddish yellow. The inflorescence is a feathery array of spikelet units. Each unit is composed of one hairy, tan, fertile spikelet with a twisted awn up to 3.5 centimeters long twinned with a stalked, sterile spikelet which is much smaller and lacks an awn. The long-haired spikelets are wind-dispersed.

In its native range, this grass is useful as a forage for grazing animals and a groundcover for revegetating cleared land. It is very drought resistant. It is considered an indicator of rangeland damage, as it is often one of the first native species to be eliminated when an area is overgrazed.

It is known elsewhere as an introduced species and sometimes a weed, such as in Hawaii.

It is grown as an ornamental plant for its showy inflorescences.

References

External links
Grass Manual Treatment: Bothriochloa barbinodis
Jepson Manual Treatment: Bothriochloa barbinodis
USDA Plants Profile for Bothriochloa barbinodis
Vascular Plants of the Gila Wilderness
Bothriochloa barbinodis Photo gallery

barbinodis
Bunchgrasses of North America
Bunchgrasses of South America
Flora of Central America
Grasses of Argentina
Grasses of Mexico
Grasses of the United States
Native grasses of California
Native grasses of Texas
Grasses of Alabama
Flora of the Southeastern United States
Flora of the Southwestern United States
Flora of Brazil
Natural history of the California chaparral and woodlands
Flora without expected TNC conservation status